Mohammad-Ali Amoui is an Iranian communist politician and former military officer.

He was a member of the Tudeh Military Network that was uncovered in 1954, for which he spent 25 years in prison until 1979. Following the Iranian Revolution, he was released and became a member of the central committee of the Tudeh Party of Iran, before unsuccessfully running for an Assembly of Experts for Constitution seat from Tehran constituency. He was imprisoned again in 1983.

References 

Living people
Central Committee of the Tudeh Party of Iran members
People from Kermanshah
Iranian prisoners and detainees
Imperial Iranian Army personnel
Iranian people convicted of spying for the Soviet Union
Tudeh Military Network members
1923 births